Quiet Sun were an English progressive rock/jazz fusion band from the Canterbury scene consisting of Phil Manzanera (guitars), Bill MacCormick (bass), Dave Jarrett (keyboards) and Charles Hayward (drums).

History
Having originated from a Dulwich College band by the name of Pooh and the Ostrich Feather, Quiet Sun was formed in 1970 after MacCormick had made friends with Robert Wyatt, the son of a friend of his mother's. The band integrated jazz elements and sparkling keyboard sounds into their complex music, in many ways similar to contemporaries Soft Machine. However, energetic guitar by Manzanera was a distinguishing feature from Soft Machine, who tended to use saxophone as their main melodic element alongside keyboards, and who did not feature lead guitar before the 1975 release of Bundles.

Quiet Sun split up in 1972, Manzanera to Roxy Music, MacCormick to Matching Mole, Hayward to This Heat, and Jarrett began to teach mathematics.

In 1975, Manzanera booked a studio for 26 days to record his album Diamond Head and got Quiet Sun together again to record an album from their old composed material in the studio at the same time. This first and only album of theirs, with participation of Brian Eno and the late Ian MacCormick, titled Mainstream, was critically acclaimed and became the New Musical Express' album of the month.  Reworked versions of "Rongwrong" and "Mummy was an asteroid, Daddy was a small non-stick kitchen utensil" both appear on the album 801 Live (the latter is consolidated with a track from Diamond Head, "East of Echo", with the result titled "East of Asteroid").

Discography

Filmography
 2015: Romantic Warriors III: Canterbury Tales (DVD)

References

External links
  from manzanera.com
  from manzanera.com
 Bill MacCormick - a 1995 interview with Bill for Facelift, illustrating his musical development from 1966 through the early 1980s, with many details from various musicians' activities over the years
 Charles Hayward interview
 Collapso - Canterbury Music Family Tree

English progressive rock groups
Jazz fusion ensembles
Canterbury scene
Island Records artists